Louis Armstrong New Orleans International Airport  (French: Aéroport international Louis Armstrong de La Nouvelle-Orléans) is an international airport under Class B airspace in Kenner, Jefferson Parish, Louisiana, United States. A small portion of Runway 11/29 is in unincorporated St. Charles Parish. Armstrong International is the primary commercial airport for the New Orleans metropolitan area and southeast Louisiana.

MSY covers 1,500 acres (607 ha) of land.

History

Beginnings
Plans for a new airport began in 1940, as evidence mounted that the older Shushan Airport (New Orleans Lakefront Airport) was too small.

The airport was originally named Moisant Field after daredevil aviator John Moisant, who died in 1910 in an airplane crash on agricultural land where the airport is now located. Its IATA code MSY was derived from Moisant Stock Yards, as Lakefront Airport retained the code NEW. In World War II the land became a government air base. It returned to civil control after the war and commercial service began at Moisant Field in May 1946.

On September 19, 1947, the airport was shut down as it was submerged under two feet of water in the wake of the 1947 Fort Lauderdale Hurricane's impact.

When commercial service began at Moisant Field in 1946, the terminal was a large, makeshift hangar-like building—a sharp contrast to airports in then-peer cities. A new terminal complex, designed by Goldstein Parham & Labouisse and Herbert A. Benson, George J. Riehl and built by J. A. Jones Company, debuted in 1959 towards the end of Mayor DeLesseps "Chep" Morrison's administration.  Retired United States Air Force Major General Junius Wallace Jones served as airport director in the 1950s. During his term, the airport received many improvements.

The original terminal was designed by Goldstein Parham & Labouisse and Herbert A. Benson, George J. Riehl and built by J. A. Jones Company, and opened in 1959. The core of this structure formed much of the facility used until November 2019. It is situated on the south side of the airfield. The terminal contained two sections, East and West, connected by a central ticketing alley. Four concourses, A, B, C and D, were attached to the terminal, and had a total of 47 gates. The vaulted arrivals lounge at the head of Concourse C and the adjacent, western half of the ticketing alley are the remaining portions of the airport's 1959 terminal complex.

During the administration of Morrison's successor, Vic Schiro, the government sponsored studies of the feasibility of relocating New Orleans International Airport to a new site, contemporaneous with similar efforts that were ultimately successful in Houston (George Bush Intercontinental Airport) and Dallas (Dallas/Fort Worth International Airport). This attempt got as far as recommending a site in New Orleans East; a man-made island was to be created south of I-10 and north of U.S. Route 90 in a bay of Lake Pontchartrain. In the early 1970s it was decided that the current airport should be expanded instead, leading to the construction of a lengthened main terminal ticketing area, an airport access road linking the terminal to I-10, and the present-day Concourses A and B. New Orleans Mayor Sidney Barthelemy, in office from 1986 to 1994, later reintroduced the idea of building a new international airport for the city, with consideration given to other sites in New Orleans East, as well as on the Northshore in suburban St. Tammany Parish. Only a couple months before Hurricane Katrina's landfall, Mayor Ray Nagin again proposed a new airport for New Orleans, this time to the west in Montz. These initiatives met with the same fate as 1960s-era efforts concerning construction of a new airport for New Orleans.

Historical airline service
In 1969, Braniff International Airways was operating direct, no change of plane service to Honolulu via a stop at Dallas with Boeing 707-320 jetliners flying the route three days a week with one of the flights also making a stop at Hilo. By the early and mid-1970s, airlines operating jet service into the airport included domestic air carriers Braniff International, Continental Airlines, Delta Air Lines, Eastern Air Lines, National Airlines (1934-1980), Southern Airways, 
Texas International Airlines and United Airlines as well as Central American airlines Aviateca and SAHSA. In 1974, two airlines had begun operating wide body jetliners into the airport: National with McDonnell Douglas DC-10 nonstops from Houston Intercontinental Airport, Los Angeles, Miami, and Tampa, and Delta with Lockheed L-1011 TriStar nonstop service from LaGuardia Airport in New York City. Several other airlines also operated wide body jets on domestic flights into the airport at various times during the 1980s and early 1990s including American Airlines and Pan Am with the DC-10, Eastern with the L-1011 TriStar, and Continental and Northeastern International Airways with the Airbus A300 with the latter air carrier operating a small hub at MSY in the spring of 1984. Another airline which attempted to operate a hub at MSY was short-lived Pride Air which was based in New Orleans and was operating nonstop or direct Boeing 727 service from the airport to sixteen destinations including cities in California, Florida, and the western U.S. in the summer of 1985.

During the 1960s, Japan Airlines (JAL) used New Orleans as a technical stop on its multi-stop special service between Tokyo and São Paulo, Brazil. On January 25, 1979, Southwest Airlines began nonstop Boeing 737-200 flights between New Orleans and Houston Hobby Airport thus marking the first time this air carrier had operated service outside of the state of Texas. By early 1985, air carriers operating jet service into MSY besides Southwest included American Airlines, Continental Airlines, Delta Air Lines, Eastern Air Lines, Florida Express Airlines, LACSA, Muse Air, New York Air, Northwest Airlines (operating as Northwest Orient Airlines at this time), Ozark Air Lines, Pan Am, Piedmont Airlines, Republic Airlines, Trans World Airlines (TWA), United Airlines, USAir and Western Airlines with commuter air carriers Air New Orleans and Royale Airlines operating small turboprop aircraft into the airport at this same time as well.

National Airlines operated New Orleans' first transatlantic flight in July 1978; the carrier began offering direct service to Frankfurt via Amsterdam aboard McDonnell Douglas DC-10s. Less than a month later, however, National reported that the flight would make an additional stop in Tampa to board more passengers, as demand was low from New Orleans. The airline intended to bring back a nonstop route to Europe the following year. Nevertheless, Pan Am did not continue any transatlantic service from Louisiana after assuming control of National Airlines in 1980. Meanwhile, British Airways flew to the airport between 1981 and 1982; the airline's Lockheed L-1011 TriStars would refuel and pick up passengers in New Orleans en route from Mexico City to Gatwick Airport near London.

By the time the previous airport terminal building opened in 1959, the name Moisant International Airport was being used for the New Orleans facility. In 1961, the name was changed to New Orleans International Airport. In July 2001, to honor the 100th anniversary of Louis Armstrong's birth (August 4, 1901), the airport's name became Louis Armstrong New Orleans International Airport.

Post-Hurricane Katrina capacity restoration

MSY reopened to commercial flights on September 13, 2005, after the devastation of Hurricane Katrina the previous month, with four flights operated by Delta Air Lines to Atlanta and a Northwest Airlines flight to Memphis. Slowly, service from other carriers began to resume, with limited service offered by Southwest Airlines, Continental Airlines, and American Airlines. Eventually, all carriers announced their return to MSY, with the exception of America West Airlines (which merged into US Airways two weeks later) and international carrier TACA. In early 2006, Continental Airlines (since merged into United Airlines) became the first airline to return to pre-Katrina flight frequency levels, and in September 2006, to pre-Katrina seat capacity levels.

All international service into MSY was suspended while the FIS facility was closed post-Katrina. The facility reopened to chartered flights arriving from London, Manchester, Bournemouth, and Nottingham, UK—all carrying tourists in for Mardi Gras and set to depart aboard a cruise liner.

On November 21, 2006, the New Orleans Aviation Board approved an air service initiative to promote increased service to Armstrong International:
 Airlines qualify for a $0.75 credit per seat toward terminal use charges for scheduled departing seats exceeding 85% of pre-Katrina capacity levels for a twelve-month period.
 Airlines qualify for a waiver of landing fees for twelve months following the initiation of service to an airport not presently served from New Orleans.

On January 17, 2008, the city's aviation board voted on an amended incentive program that waives landing fees for the first two airlines to fly nonstop into a city not presently served from the airport. Under the new ruling, landing fees will be waived for up to two airlines flying into an "underserved destination airport."

Recent years
In 2013, city leaders started approaching different airlines with the goal of convincing one of them to introduce a link between New Orleans and a European metropolis. Their efforts paid off when British Airways returned to Louisiana in March 2017 with nonstop Boeing 787 service to London's Heathrow Airport. In May, Condor reconnected New Orleans to Frankfurt, this time with seasonal, nonstop service.

MSY served 9,785,394 passengers in 2014, exceeding for the first time in the post-Katrina era the total passenger count of 9,733,179 achieved in 2004, the last full calendar year prior to Katrina's landfall in August 2005. A new record passenger count was set by the airport in 2015. 10,673,301 passengers were served, eclipsing the earlier record of 9.9 million passengers, set in 2000.

In December 2015, the New Orleans Aviation Board, along with New Orleans Mayor Mitch Landrieu and City Council, approved a plan to build a new $598 million terminal building on the north side of the airport property with two concourses and 30 gates. Designed by world-renowned Argentine-American architect Cesar Pelli, construction on the new main terminal began in January 2016, with Hunt-Gibbs-Boh-Metro listed as the contractor at-risk. During the construction, the scope of the project was expanded so the terminal would feature 35 gates. The new terminal opened in November 2019 at a cost of $1.3 billion.

Facilities

Terminal
MSY has a single terminal with three concourses and 35 gates. Departures and Ticketing are on Level 3, TSA Security Screening is on Level 2, and Arrivals and Baggage Claim are on Level 1. International flights are processed in Concourse A, which contains the airport's customs facilities.

Concourse A has 6 gates.
Concourse B has 14 gates.
Concourse C has 15 gates.

Ground transportation
The terminal is served by Interstate 10 at exit 221. Bus service between the airport and downtown New Orleans is provided by New Orleans Regional Transit Authority Airport Express Route 202 and Jefferson Transit bus E-2., which boards from the third floor entrance.  Airport Shuttle has services to most hotels and hostels in the Central Business District of New Orleans for $22 per person (one-way) and $44 per person (round-trip).

The rental car facility is on the south side of the airfield next to the former terminal.

Airlines and destinations

Passenger

Cargo

Statistics

Passenger numbers

Top domestic destinations

Airline market share

Accidents and incidents
 On November 16, 1959 National Airlines Flight 967, a Douglas DC-7 flying from Tampa to New Orleans crashed into the Gulf of Mexico. All 42 passengers and crew were killed.
 On February 25, 1964, Eastern Air Lines Flight 304 operated with a Douglas DC-8 flying from New Orleans International Airport to Washington Dulles International Airport crashed nine minutes after takeoff. All 51 passengers and 7 crew members were killed.
 On March 30, 1967, Delta Air Lines Flight 9877, a Douglas DC-8-51, a training exercise with 6 crewmembers aboard, crashed on approach to MSY at 12:50 AM Central Time Zone after simulating a two-engine out approach, resulting in a loss of control. All 6 crewmembers and 13 on the ground were killed. The DC-8 crashed into a residential area, destroying several homes and a motel complex.
 On March 20, 1969, Douglas DC-3 N142D, leased from Avion Airways for a private charter, crashed on landing, killing 16 of the 27 passengers and crew members on board. The aircraft was operating a domestic non-scheduled passenger flight from Memphis International Airport, Tennessee.
 On July 9, 1982, Pan Am Flight 759, en route from Miami to San Diego, departed New Orleans International on its way to a second stop-over at Las Vegas. The aircraft traveled 4,610 feet (1405 m) beyond the end of Runway 10, hitting trees along the way, until crashing into a residential neighborhood. A total of 153 people were killed (all 145 on board and 8 on the ground). The crash was, at the time, the second-deadliest civil aviation disaster in U.S. history. The National Transportation Safety Board determined the probable cause was the aircraft's encounter with a microburst-induced wind shear during the liftoff. This atmospheric condition created a downdraft and decreasing headwind forcing the plane downward. Modern wind shear detection equipment protecting flights from such conditions is now in place both onboard planes and at most commercial airports, including Armstrong International.
 On May 24, 1988, TACA Flight 110 was forced to glide without power and make an emergency landing on top of a levee east of New Orleans International Airport after flame-out in both engines of the Boeing 737-300 in a severe thunderstorm. There were no casualties and the aircraft was subsequently repaired and returned to service.
On April 4, 2011, United Airlines Flight 497 en route from New Orleans to San Francisco made an emergency landing back at New Orleans after smoke entered the cockpit due to an electrical fault. The aircraft excursed from the runway during landing, sustaining minor damage. All 109 people on board evacuated the aircraft with no injuries.

See also
Louisiana World War II Army Airfields

References

External links

 Louis Armstrong New Orleans International Airport, official site
  (hosted on Greater New Orleans Free Net, GNOFN, Inc.)
 
 

Airports in Louisiana
Airports established in 1946
Airfields of the United States Army Air Forces in Louisiana
Airfields of the United States Army Air Forces Technical Service Command
Buildings and structures in Jefferson Parish, Louisiana
Buildings and structures in St. Charles Parish, Louisiana
Transportation in Jefferson Parish, Louisiana
Transportation in the New Orleans metropolitan area
Transportation in St. Charles Parish, Louisiana
Airports in the New Orleans metropolitan area
1946 establishments in Louisiana